Corral de Tierra (Spanish for "Pen of Earth") is an unincorporated community in Monterey County, California. It is located in the Corral de Tierra Valley, on the former land grant of Corral de Tierra, at an elevation of 404 feet (123 m).

Government
At the county level, Corral de Tierra is represented on the Monterey County Board of Supervisors by Supervisor Mary Adams.

In the United States House of Representatives, Corral de Tierra is in

Geography 
The community of Corral de Tierra lies along Highway 68 midway between Salinas and the Monterey Peninsula.
State Route (SR) 68 stretches 20 miles between Salinas and Pacific Grove. It is part of the DeAnza Trail, a route that once linked all of California’s mission settlements during the Spanish Colonial era. CalTrans had plans to turn SR 68 into a freeway in the 1950s and 1960s, but environmental concerns stopped the expansion. As of 2006, the route carried 26,000 vehicles a day. Many of these trips are generated by 13,500 residents who now live in the Toro Park, San Benancio and Corral de Tierra districts.

The corner of Corral de Tierra and Highway 68 is 10 miles from the City of Monterey, 7 miles from the City of Salinas, 9.8 miles from the City of Seaside, and 8 miles from the town of Del Rey Oaks. It is in close proximity to many coastal and inland cities.

Popular culture
John Steinbeck’s The Pastures of Heaven, a short story cycle published in 1932, is set in the valley. In their youth, Steinbeck and his sister, Mary, played at the base of Castle Rock, the “fence of earth” giving Corral de Tierra its Spanish name.

The beautiful valley between Monterey and Salinas, granted by Governor Guiterrez to Francisco Figueroa in 1836, inspired Steinbeck’s short stories and California-based novels. In the last half century, small neighborhoods have been built in the valleys running off the Monterey-Salinas Highway, and a sense of independent identity and community has formed among the residents in the community of Corral de Tierra, California 93908.

References

Unincorporated communities in Monterey County, California
Salinas Valley
1912 establishments in California
Unincorporated communities in California